Artyom Raufovich Pogosov (born 1 August 1999) is a Russian football player who plays for FC Ufa.

Club career
He made his debut in the Russian Football National League for FC Volgar Astrakhan on 1 August 2020 in a game against FC Krasnodar-2, he started the game and scored a goal on his FNL debut.

References

External links
 
 Profile by Russian Football National League
 

1999 births
Living people
Russian footballers
Russia youth international footballers
Association football forwards
FC Volgar Astrakhan players
FC Ufa players
Russian First League players
Russian Second League players